The University Mall, often referred to as the U-Mall, is an enclosed shopping mall in South Burlington, Vermont. The name refers to its proximity to the University of Vermont. At , it is  the largest shopping mall in Vermont and is one of two enclosed malls in the Burlington metropolitan area. JCPenney, Kohl's, and Target are the anchor stores. It also features an H&M. The mall encompasses 77 shops, including two sit-down restaurants, and a food court. KeyPoint Partners, LLC of Burlington, Massachusetts is the mall's management company.

History
Construction of the University Mall was completed in 1979. Original anchors were Almy's and Zayre. Zayre relocated to a freestanding store in the mall in 1987 and an expansion took over the old Zayre in 1989 connecting the new Zayre. Zayre was rebranded as Ames the same year. Almy's closed in 1987 and became Steinbach in 1992. The mall got a second expansion in 1992 with JCPenney becoming the third anchor. The mall got a third expansion in 1998 with a 2-story Sears becoming the fourth anchor, plus a 4-story parking garage. Steinbach closed in 1999 and became The Bon-Ton the same year. Ames closed in 2002 following their Chapter 7 bankruptcy and became Kohl's in April 2004. The mall was renovated in 2005.

On October 18, 2017, it was announced that regional division The Bon-Ton would be closing in January 2018. 

On October 19, 2017, Target announced that they will be opening a small-format store and their first store in Vermont in the former Bon-Ton on October 19, 2018.

On November 7, 2019, it was announced Sears would be closing.

Operations
The rental per square foot is proprietary information. Average pro-rata tax payment for a non-anchor store is about $2 per .

As of January 2015, mall management reported that the mall was fully tenanted with the exception of two food court spaces.

Tenants
The University Mall has an array of stores and areas to eat. Various national retailers have their only Burlington, Vermont area store within the mall, including the four current anchor stores. In 2009, Vermont's first International House of Pancakes opened here, becoming the mall's second sit-down restaurant. There is also a food court in the center of the mall.

References

External links
University Mall website

Buildings and structures in South Burlington, Vermont
Shopping malls in Vermont
Shopping malls established in 1979
Tourist attractions in Chittenden County, Vermont
1979 establishments in Vermont